Vučak may refer to:

Croatia 
 , village in the town of Donja Stubica

Serbia 
 Vučak (Glogovac), village in the municipality of Glogovac
 Vučak (Ivanjica), village in the municipality of Ivanjica
 Vučak (Kruševac), village  in the municipality of Kruševac
 Vučak (Smederevo), village  in the municipality of Smederevo